Colin Cryan (born 23 March 1981) is an Irish former professional footballer.

He played as a defender for Sheffield United, Scarborough, Lincoln City, Boston United and Droylsden.

External links

Unofficial Colin Cryan Profile at The Forgotten Imp

1981 births
Living people
Association footballers from Dublin (city)
Republic of Ireland association footballers
Association football defenders
Sheffield United F.C. players
Scarborough F.C. players
Lincoln City F.C. players
Boston United F.C. players
Droylsden F.C. players
Republic of Ireland under-21 international footballers
National League (English football) players
English Football League players